The 1933 Normanton by-election was a parliamentary by-election held for the British House of Commons constituency of Normanton on 8 May 1933.  The seat had become vacant on the death of the Labour Member of Parliament Frederick Hall, who had held the seat since a previous by-election in 1905.

Following Labour's declaration of former Pontefract MP Tom Smith as their candidate, the Communist Party of Great Britain declared unemployed Castleford engineer John William Malkin as their competing candidate. However, as the Communist Party was at the time opposed to the requirement of a £150 deposit, their candidate was declared to be invalid and Labour's candidate was returned unopposed. Smith represented the constituency until he resigned his seat in 1947, triggering another by-election.

References

See also
Normanton (UK Parliament constituency)
1947 Normanton by-election
List of United Kingdom by-elections

1933 elections in the United Kingdom
1933 in England
By-elections to the Parliament of the United Kingdom in West Yorkshire constituencies
Unopposed by-elections to the Parliament of the United Kingdom (need citation)
Elections in Wakefield
1930s in Yorkshire